Abby Ringquist ( Hughes; born June 21, 1989) is an American former ski jumper who competed from 2004 to 2018.

Career
Ringquist made her World Cup debut in the 2011/12 season, with her best individual result being ninth place in Sochi on December 9, 2012; her best team result was seventh in Zaō on 20 January 2018. In her final event before retiring, she competed at the 2018 Winter Olympics in Pyeongchang, finishing 29th in the individual competition.

References

External links

Abby Ringquist profile at Women's Ski Jumping USA
2018 Winter Olympics Bio - Abby Ringquist at ESPN
Athlete Spotlight: US Ski Jumper Abby Ringquist at Robert Irvine

1989 births
Living people
American female ski jumpers
Skiers from Salt Lake City
Ski jumpers at the 2018 Winter Olympics
Olympic ski jumpers of the United States
21st-century American women